Marilia Gregoriou (born 13 February 1980) is a Cypriot sprinter. She competed in the women's 200 metres at the 2004 Summer Olympics.

References

1980 births
Living people
Athletes (track and field) at the 2004 Summer Olympics
Cypriot female sprinters
Olympic athletes of Cyprus
Athletes (track and field) at the 2001 Mediterranean Games
Athletes (track and field) at the 2005 Mediterranean Games
Place of birth missing (living people)
Mediterranean Games competitors for Cyprus
Olympic female sprinters